The Thunder 9 is a full-size semi-automatic handgun manufactured by Bersa at the Ramos Mejia production plant in Argentina. It is also sold under the name Firestorm or FS 9.

Derivatives in other calibres include the Thunder 40 and Thunder 45.

Development History
This handgun is an evolution of the Model 90, the first full-size 9mm Luger pistol made by the Argentine company and introduced in 1989. In 1994, when the entire Bersa pistol production line was renamed "Thunder", the Model 90 was modified with better functionalities and placement of the fire control group, match barrel, improved sights, better ergonomics, lighter weight and increased magazine capacity. It then became the full-size offering of the Thunder model range.

Design

The Thunder 9 shares little in common with the other handguns in the company's product line. While the smaller Thunders are blow-back pistols similar to the Walther PPK, the Thunder 9 is a full-size, short-recoil handgun to handle the greater pressure of the 9mm Parabellum cartridge. The gun bears some resemblance to the Walther P88 pistol.

The slide and barrel are high strength steel and the frame is aluminum alloy. Available finishes are black matte, nickel, and a two-tone with a nickel finished slide and satin black frame. All the available finishing styles are non-reflective. The polymer grips are integrated "wraparound" style. The trigger is double-action for the first shot, single-action thereafter. The magazine is double stack and the slide remains open after the last round is fired. The magazine release button can be reversed for left-handed shooters and it has a "round in the chamber" indicator. It is one of the easiest, if not the easiest, semi-automatic handgun to field strip for cleaning.

The pistol features ambidextrous safety, a decocker activated by the safety lever, emphasized sights, combat trigger guard, an integrated accessory mounting groove in the frame (added after the year 2000, in the Pro, for Professional, version), firing pin block; the pistol will not fire unless the trigger is squeezed all the way back protecting from accidental falling.

Variants
From the original Thunder 9, many other versions were introduced later on.

Calibers
The number after the name "Thunder" identify the cartridge fired.  They are called the Thunder 9, Thunder 40, and Thunder 45 for the 9mm Luger, .40 S&W, and .45 ACP cartridges, respectively. The Thunder 9 and Thunder 45 Ultra Compact are +P rated.

Compact Versions
The Compact versions of the Bersa Thunder full-size handguns were introduced at the end of the 1990s. Initially the name was "Mini Thunder" later changed to "Thunder Ultra Compact". Available chamberings are 9mm Parabellum, .40 S&W and .45 ACP. The .45 version is not available in a full-size handgun. Barrel length is reduced to 3.25 inches (3.6 for the .45 ACP caliber).

The Thunder Ultra Compact features a security key to activate a security locking system located on the left side of the frame under the take down lever, in the locked position the hammer cannot be cocked, the trigger won't work in double action, the slide won't cycle and the gun cannot be disassembled. Each pistol has an individual key.

Shooting Competitions
Bersa Thunder full-size pistols have won several IPSC matches and are always very competitive either with the official Team Bersa or in the hands of private shooters.

Users

 
 Argentine Federal Police
 Buenos Aires City Police
 Buenos Aires Provincial Police
 Santa Fe Provincial Police
 Law enforcement in Argentina
 
 Bangladesh Army: Bought 10,000 in 2017.
 Border Guards Bangladesh

References

External links
Official Website
Eagle Imports Official Website

.40 S&W semi-automatic pistols
.45 ACP semi-automatic pistols
9mm Parabellum semi-automatic pistols
Thunder 9
Semi-automatic pistols of Argentina